Vgenopoulos is a Greek surname. Notable people with the surname include:

Andreas Vgenopoulos (1953–2016), Greek fencer, lawyer, businessman and football investor
Nikolaos Vgenopoulos (1926–1985), Greek member of the European Parliament for Greece

Greek-language surnames
Surnames